Geoff Waugh (born August 25, 1983) is a retired Canadian-Croatian ice hockey defenceman who last played for the Nottingham Panthers of the Elite Ice Hockey League (EIHL).

Playing career
He played Junior "A" hockey for the Kindersley Klippers of the Saskatchewan Junior Hockey League from 2001 to 2003. The Dallas Stars chose him 78th overall in the 2002 NHL Entry Draft.

Waugh then joined the Northern Michigan Wildcats of the NCAA for four years. In 2006-07 he turned pro with the Springfield Falcons and the Johnstown Chiefs.

He then signed as a free agent with the Ottawa Senators in 2008 and played for two seasons with their farm teams the Binghamton Senators and the Elmira Jackals. He played for the Portland Pirates, Manitoba Moose, and the Victoria Salmon Kings until 2011, when he joined KHL Medveščak Zagreb of the then EBEL.

After three seasons within Zagreb, including an injury-hit inaugural season in the Kontinental Hockey League. The now Croatian citizen, opted to return to the EBEL, signing with Austrian club EC VSV on June 15, 2014.

On June 2, 2015, Waugh left Austria as a free agent and signed a one-year deal with British club, the Nottingham Panthers of the EIHL.

Career statistics

Regular season and playoffs

International

References

External links

1983 births
Binghamton Senators players
Canadian ice hockey defencemen
Dallas Stars draft picks
Elmira Jackals (ECHL) players
Johnstown Chiefs players
KHL Medveščak Zagreb players
Living people
Manitoba Moose players
Northern Michigan Wildcats men's ice hockey players
Portland Pirates players
Ice hockey people from Winnipeg
Springfield Falcons players
Victoria Salmon Kings players
EC VSV players
Nottingham Panthers players
Canadian expatriate ice hockey players in England
Canadian expatriate ice hockey players in Austria
Canadian expatriate ice hockey players in Croatia
Canadian expatriate ice hockey players in the United States